Pyotr Anatolyevich Krasilov (born 3 June 1977) is a Russian film and theater actor.

Biography
Pyotr Krasilov was born in Balashikha near Moscow. His family consisted of mostly Putilov company employees, dispatchers, railway workers. His mother worked for a while in the circus, in the personnel department.

In 1999 he graduated from the Mikhail Shchepkin Higher Theatre School. Then for a while he worked in the Russian Army Theatre and then in Lenkom. But Krasilov did not stay long in either place. Pyotr did not get major roles immediately, but soon he received a proposal from the Academic Youth Theatre.

The first role of Pyotr Krasilov in film was Mikhail Repnin in the series Poor Nastya (2003).

Selected filmography 
 2003 Poor Nastya (TV Series) as Prince Mikhail Alexandrovich Repnin
 2004 Sins of the Fathers (TV Series) as Dmitry Pavlovsky
 2005 Not Born Beautiful (TV Series) as Roman Malinovsky Roman Malinovskiy
 2007 Second Wind as Pavel Makarov
 2007 Patties with Potatoes as Yuri
 2010 Carousel as Denis
 2011 The Secret Service Agent's Memories (2 Season) as Semyon Plakhov
 2011 Surprise Me as major Roman Zubov

Awards 
 Winner of the Audience Choice Award (1995)
 Winner of the  Chayka Award (nominated for Breakthrough, 2002) for the role of Erast Fandorin in the play The Winter Queen

References

External links 
   Official website  
 

1977 births
Living people
People from Balashikha
Russian male film actors
Russian male stage actors
Russian male television actors
Male actors from Moscow
20th-century Russian male actors
21st-century Russian male actors